Ballygarrett is a rural village in the southeastern corner of Ireland. The birthplace of Texas empresario James Power, Ballygarrett is twinned with Refugio, Texas.

Transport
There is a bus once a day (not Sundays) to and from Gorey, departing in the morning and returning in the afternoon. On Mondays and Saturdays Bus Éireann route 379 operates and continues to Wexford via Curracloe. Route 879 operates on Tuesdays, Thursdays and Fridays. On Wednesdays the service is provided by the Rural Roadrunner bus operated by Wexford Local Development.

The nearest station is Gorey railway station, around 15 kilometres distance.

Sport
The Gaelic Athletic Association club in Ballygarrett is called Réalt na Mara GAA club. In 1982, the old clubs of Réalt na Mara and Ballygarrett amalgamated to form the present-day club.

See also
 List of towns and villages in Ireland

References

External links
 

Towns and villages in County Wexford
Irish-American history and culture in Texas